Neerja Pandit is an Indian playback singer in Hindi film and television music and also a live performer. She has also recorded songs for Telugu films.

Early life

Pandit obtained a MA degree in music from Chandigarh University and has also studied under musicians such as Shambhunath Sopori, Bhajan Sopori, Shambhu Senji and Dhruba Ghosh.

She married noted filmmaker and social activist Ashoke Pandit in the year 1988.

Television and film

She has won Rapa Awards for her title songs in major Indian television soaps Sarhad and Tere Mere Sapne. She has also sung several title numbers for various soaps and sitcoms like Mukkammal (Sahara One), Gul Gulshan Gulfam (DD), Shapath (Zee), Maharaja Ranjit Singh (DD), Noorjehan (DD), Mast Mast Hai Zindagi (Zee), Filmi Chakkar (Zee), Specials@10 – Heroine (Sony) and many more. Neerja has also recorded an album with Venus, a reputed music company – an album consisting of major Bollywood remixes. Her voice has been associated with respected film banners and music directors. She has sung her the guidance of maestro music directors like Lalit Sen, Raju Singh, Nadeem Shravan, M.M. Kreem, Roop Kumar Rathod, Shamir Tandon and so on. She has sung for films like Yeh Dil, Indian Babu, Sheen and Traffic Signal.

Kashmiri folk music

Neerja is associated with Kashmiri folk music. Her albums have always been chartbusters. She has the credit for successful albums like Cheshma bu Wondai, Yaadvotur, Patram Pushpam, Kashmiri Club Mix – an attempt to acquaint the new generation with the folklore of Kashmir. Her recent albums Sangarmaal and Ruhaniyat were major hits during her USA & Canada tour.

To continue with her musical series of nostalgia and the longing for the valley she came up with her most recent Kashmiri folk album called Kong Vaer paying a tribute to the musical legends of Kashmir.

She is also coming up with yet another traditional folk album titled Reshvaer later this year, which is a collection of soulful Kashmiri folk songs.

Live performances

Neerja has been regularly performing live all across the globe. Her most outstanding shows have been in Mauritius, Nepal, Dubai, U.K, U.S.A and Canada and all around India. She has performed in live concerts with the likes of Bappi Lahiri, Nadeem-Shravan, Jatin-Latin, Abhijeet and others. She recently performed in shows along with major Bollywood playback singers and a show featuring Amitabh Bachchan.

Filmography

Hindi
 Traffic Signal (2007)
 Sheen (2004)
 Indian Babu (2003)
 Yeh Dil (2003)
 Khoobsurat (1999)

Regional
 Chatrapati- M.M. Kreem (Telugu)
 Piya Piya Bole Jiya (Bhojpuri)
 O ji re Diwana (Rajasthani)
 Mata Rani Bhatiyani (Rajasthani)
 Nakoda Bhairav (Rajasthani)

Television
 Mukkammal (Sahara One)
 Filmi Chakkar (Zee TV)
 Mast Mast hain Zindagi (Zee TV)
 Tere Mere Sapne (Zee TV)
 Sarhad (Alfa Punjabi)
 Shapath (Zee TV)
 Noorjehan (DD National)
 Gul Gulshan Gulfam (DD National)
 Hanste Khelte (Zee TV)
 Chahat Nafrat (Zee TV)
 Ehsaas (Doordarshan)
 Naagin (Zee TV)
 Specials@10 : Heroine-zindagi ke panno se (Sony)- 12 FILMS
 Maharaja Ranjit Singh (DD National)

Devotional albums 

 Durga Kavach with Gundecha Brothers
 Sant Sarovar with Udit Narayan, Suresh Wadkar and Mohd. Aziz

References

External links
 Neerja Pandit entry on Kashmir Education, Culture and Science Society website
 Bio on Kashmiri Overseas Association website
 Profile on Sufi Singers

1966 births
Living people
Bollywood playback singers
Indian women playback singers
Chandigarh University alumni
21st-century Indian singers
21st-century Indian women singers